The women's team archery event is one of 5 archery events scheduled to take place at the 2020 Summer Olympics. It is planned to be held at  Yumenoshima Park.   

South Korea remained undefeated in the Women's team Archery by winning a 9th consecutive gold medal.

Background

This will be the 9th consecutive appearance of the event, which has been held every Games since 1988. 

Of the 12 teams that competed in 2016, 8 qualified to return, including all four semifinalists (winner South Korea, silver medalist Russia (competing as "ROC" athletes this Games), bronze medalist Chinese Taipei, and fourth-place finisher Italy). The other teams from 2016 that have qualified to return are Japan, Mexico, China, and Ukraine. Germany has qualified to return for the first time since 2004; Great Britain and the United States competed in 2012. Belarus will be competing in the event for the first time.

South Korea has won all 8 of the previous appearances of the event. Chinese Taipei is the reigning world champion, having defeated South Korea in the finals at the 2019 World Archery Championships.

Qualification 

12 teams qualify for the women's team archery event. The top 8 National Olympic Committees (NOCs) at the 2019 World Archery Championships qualified. One place was reserved for the host, Japan; the 2021 Archery Final Olympic Qualification Tournament would award either three or four places depending on whether Japan qualified through the World Championships. Because Japan did not, there were three places available at the Final OQT.

Teams that qualified for the team event also received 3 automatic qualification places for the team members in the individual event as well.

Competition format

As with the other archery events, the women's team was a recurve archery event, held under the World Archery-approved 70-meter distance and rules. 12 teams of 3 archers each participate. Competition begins with a ranking round, in which each archer shoots 72 arrows (this is the same ranking round used for the individual event). The combined scores from the ranking round are used to seed the teams into a single-elimination bracket, with the top 4 teams receiving a bye into the second round (quarterfinals). Each match consists of four sets of 6 arrows, two per archer. The team with the highest score in the set – the total of the six arrows – receives two set points; if the teams are tied, each receives one set point. The first team to five set points wins the match. If the match is tied at 4–4 after 4 sets, a tie-breaker set is used with each archer on the team shooting one arrow; if the score of the tie-breaker set remains tied, the closest arrow to the center wins.

Records

Prior to this competition, the existing world and Olympic records were as follows.

 216 arrow ranking round

Schedule

All times are Japan Standard Time (UTC+9)

The schedule for the women's team event covers two separate days of competition.

Results

Ranking round

Competition bracket

 The figure in italics signifies the set scores.

References

Archery at the 2020 Summer Olympics
Women's events at the 2020 Summer Olympics